The Scout and Guide movement in Turkey is served by
Scouting and Guiding Federation of Turkey, member of the World Organization of the Scout Movement and the World Association of Girl Guides and Girl Scouts
Federation of Scout Union of Thrace (Trakya İzciler Birliği Federasyonu), member of the World Organization of Independent Scouts

See also

References